The 2007 Goody's Cool Orange 500 was the sixth race of the 2007 NASCAR Nextel Cup Series season. It was held on Sunday, April 1, 2007 at the 0.526 mile Martinsville Speedway in Martinsville, Virginia, the circuit's shortest (by distance) oval.

The event was the second to use NASCAR's Car of Tomorrow template, and the first in which the 2007 Top 35 teams (by owner points) were awarded exemptions.

The winner of the race was Jimmie Johnson of the Hendrick Motorsports team.  His teammate, Jeff Gordon, placed second by less than a second after a battle between the two during the last laps of the race.  Gordon attempted many times to take the lead from Johnson by passing on the inside, however Johnson held his position and managed to regain spacing ahead of Gordon on the straightaways.

Race results

Did not qualify
The following drivers did not make the race:

Michael Waltrip (No. 55), Brian Vickers (No. 83), Paul Menard (No. 15), Kenny Wallace (No. 78), Kevin Lepage (No. 37),and Ward Burton (No. 4).

External links
Race results 
Standings after this race 
Starting lineup 

Goody's Cool Orange 500
Goody's Cool Orange 500
NASCAR races at Martinsville Speedway
April 2007 sports events in the United States